The Choice is an extended play by American jazz saxophonist Kamasi Washington. It was billed as a companion extended play for his second studio album, Heaven and Earth, which was released on June 22, 2018.

Background 
Upon the vinyl and CD releases of Heaven and Earth, it was noted that there was a fifth record or CD encased in the centrefold of the cover. By cutting open the packaging, one could access a pressing of The Choice. When this information became publicised, an official version of The Choice was made available on June 29, one week after Heaven and Earth's initial release.

Critical reception 
The Choice received favourable reviews from critics. In a review for Pitchfork, Andy Beta scored the album a 6.5/10, stating that "[Washington explored] his mellower side without breaking any significantly new ground".

Track listing 
Notes

 "Will You Love Me Tomorrow" is a cover of Carole King and Gerry Goffin's 1960 song of the same name.
 "Ooh Child" is a cover of the Five Stairsteps 1970 song "O-o-h Child".

References 

2018 EPs
Kamasi Washington albums
Young Turks (record label) albums